Emmy Dörfel (26 March 1908  18 May 2002) was a German nurse. She was awarded the Florence Nightingale Medal on 28 June 1963.

References

1908 births
2002 deaths
Florence Nightingale Medal recipients
German women nurses
German nurses